Matagalpa is an extinct Misumalpan language formerly spoken in the central highlands of Nicaragua. The language became extinct in the 19th century, and only few short wordlists remain. It was closely related to Cacaopera. The ethnic group, which numbers about 20,000, now speaks Spanish.

References

Misumalpan languages
Extinct languages of North America
Languages of Nicaragua
Languages extinct in the 1870s